Trefor Owen (20 February 1933 – July 2001) was a Welsh amateur footballer who played in the Football League for Leyton Orient as a centre half. He won caps for Wales at schoolboy and amateur level.

References

People from Flint, Flintshire
Sportspeople from Flintshire
Welsh footballers
Association football wing halves
Leyton Orient F.C. players
English Football League players
1933 births
Wales amateur international footballers
2001 deaths
Isthmian League players
Barry Town United F.C. players
Bedworth United F.C. players
Atherstone Town F.C. players

Southern Football League players